Gymnastics was contested at the 1978 Asian Games, held in Bangkok, Thailand from December 9, 1978, to December 11, 1978. Only artistic events were contested.

Medalists

Men

Women

Medal table

References 

Results 11 December
Results 12 December

External links 
Asian Games medalists

 
1978 Asian Games events
1978
Asian Games
1978 Asian Games